György Beck (born October 23, 1988 in Budapest, Hungary) is a Hungarian figure skater. He is the 2005 Hungarian national silver medalist.

External links
 

Hungarian male single skaters
Living people
1988 births
Figure skaters from Budapest